Bolinus is a genus of sea snails, marine gastropod mollusks in the family Muricidae, the murex snails or rock snails.

This genus is known in the fossil record from the Miocene to the Pliocene period (age range: from 15.97 to 2.588 million years ago.). Fossil shells within this genus have been found in Cyprus, Austria, Italy and Turkey.

Some species of these molluscs were known since ancient times as a source for purple dye and also as a popular food source.

Description

They are usually pale or golden brown, thick and spiny with a long and straight siphonal canal and a rounded and broad body whorl.

They are carnivorous and predatory

Distribution
Snails within this genus mainly live along the Atlantic coast of Africa and in the Mediterranean Sea.

Habitat
They inhabit shallow water and prefer gravelled or rocky substrate.

Species
Species within the genus Bolinus include:
 Bolinus brandaris (Linnaeus, 1758)
 Bolinus cornutus (Linnaeus, 1758)

Bolinus Brandaris Nivea Bucquoy, Dautzenberg & Dollfus, 1882

brandaris form trispinosus Locard 1886

Bolinus brandaris longispinus Coen 1914 

brandaris form coronatus

brandaris form trituberculatus

brandaris form bicaudatus

brandaris form cagliaritanus

brandaris form brevis

brandaris form polii

brandaris form elongata

brandaris form coronatus x polii

brandaris form varicosus

brandaris form rubiginosus

Stigwan & Fabiod 2019

References

 Merle D., Garrigues B. & Pointier J.-P. (2011) Fossil and Recent Muricidae of the world. Part Muricinae. Hackenheim: Conchbooks. 648 pp.
 Gofas, S.; Le Renard, J.; Bouchet, P. (2001). Mollusca. in: Costello, M.J. et al. (eds), European Register of Marine Species: a check-list of the marine species in Europe and a bibliography of guides to their identification. Patrimoines Naturels. 50: 180-213

External links
 Pusch, G. G. (1836-1837). Polens Paläontologie, oder Abbildung und Beschreibung der vorzüglichsten und der noch unbeschriebenen Petrefakten aus den Gebirgsformationen in Polen, Volhynien und den Karpathen, nebst einigen allgemeinen Beiträgen zur Petrefaktenkunde und einem Versuch zur Vervollständigung der Geschichte des Europäischen Auer-Ochsen. E. Schweizerbart's Verlagshandlung. Stuttgart. pp. 1-80, pl. 1-10 [1836], pp. 81-218, pl. 11-15
 Jousseaume, F. P. (1880). Division méthodique de la famille des Purpuridés. Le Naturaliste. 2(42): 335-338

Muricinae
Extant Miocene first appearances